Mohammad Jaber Abdul Rahman Assaf (born 1 September 1989) is a Palestinian pop singer well known for being the winner of the second season of Arab Idol, broadcast by the MBC network. His victory received worldwide coverage from the media and was welcomed with joy by Palestinians and the rest of the Arab world. In 2013, Assaf was named a goodwill ambassador for peace by The United Nations Relief and Works Agency for Palestine Refugees (UNRWA). He was also named ambassador of culture and arts by the Palestinian government and was offered a position with "diplomatic standing" by Palestinian President Mahmoud Abbas. Assaf's story is the basis of the 2015 film The Idol, directed by Hany Abu-Assad. After Arab Idol, Assaf has gone on to enjoy huge popularity in the Arab World and the Arab diaspora and has released two albums and a great number of singles and collaborations. Most of his music is sung in the Iraqi and Gulf dialects.

Life
He was born in Misrata, Libya to Palestinian parents. He lived there until he was 4 years old, when his parents moved back to Gaza, he grew up in Khan Younis refugee camp with a middle class couple where he attended UNRWA elementary school. His mother's family hails from the village of Bayt Daras, which was captured and depopulated by the nascent IDF in 1948 and his father's family is from Beersheba. Assaf's parents moved to Khan Yunis Refugee Camp when he was four years old. He is one of six siblings, three of whom, including Assaf, have been involved in performing live music. Assaf's mother Intisar, a mathematics teacher, has stated that Assaf began singing at the age of five and "had a voice of someone who was much, much older." Before his role on the television show he was attending Gaza City's Palestine University majoring in media and public relations.  
Assaf did not have professional training as a singer; he started his career singing at weddings and other private events. He entered the public view in 2000 during a popular local television program where he called in and sung a nationalist song to the host's praise. Afterward, he was frequently offered contracts with local record companies. Sometime after his first performance, he sang in a local event in Gaza attended by late Palestinian president Yasser Arafat.

Arab Idol
Mohammad Assaf travelled from Gaza Strip to Egypt to audition for Arab Idol. It took him two days to reach Egypt by car due to complications on the border. At the beginning, he had to convince the Egyptian security at the border crossing, where he was stuck for two days, to leave Gaza. Once he reached the hotel where the auditions were taking place, the doors were closed in which they did not accept anymore auditions so he jumped over the wall. After he jumped over the wall, he couldn't get a number to audition; he sat hopelessly in the hall where other contestants were waiting for their turn. He started singing to the contestants, and a Palestinian contestant, Ramadan Abu Nahel, who was waiting to audition heard him and gave him his number saying, "I know I won't reach the finals but you will."

He was given the nickname Asaroukh ("The Rocket") by Lebanese singer and Arab Idol judge Ragheb Alama. Assaf was acclaimed by the jury and the public. His voice and appearance have drawn comparisons to Egyptian singer Abdel Halim Hafez, which has garnered Assaf both fame and controversy. Fans merged part of Hafez's name with Assaf's, as in Assaf Hilm Falastine ("Assaf Palestine’s Dream"). Assaf's final performance was his own song that was well known before his rise to fame "Ali al-kuffiyeh" ("Raise The Kuffiyeh"), a Palestinian song that called on Palestinians to raise their kuffiyehs  (a traditional Arab headdress that has become a Palestinian nationalist symbol) and to unite, in light of the split between the two major Palestinian factions, Hamas and Fatah. Hundreds of thousands of Palestinians had tuned in to watch his performance. On 22 June Assaf was declared the winner of Arab Idol, winning the most votes and coming ahead of two other competitors,  Ahmed Gamal and Farah Youssef, from Egypt and Syria, respectively. Massive celebrations by Palestinians ensued after the announcement of his victory, including festivities held on the streets of Gaza City, East Jerusalem, Nablus, Ramallah, Bethlehem, Khan Yunis, Nazareth, Lebanon and Jordan, And when his professional career as an artist began after the title of Arab Idol, he was accompanied by Awtar Band led by The Maestro Yacoub Al-Atrash in Arab and international festivals since then.

Performances in Arab Idol
Performances during the auditions 
 Casting (Cairo) : "Safini Mara" by Abdel Halim Hafez
 Casting Beirut (Group audition) : "Ana Elli Alayki Mishtaq" by Joseph Sakr
 Casting Beirut :" Ala Babi Waef Amarin" by Melhem Barakat

Performances during the primes 
 Top 27 : Ya Sghiri – Melhem Zein
 1st Prime : Aala Hisb Oudad – Abdel Halim Hafez
 2nd Prime : Ya Reit – Ragheb Alama
 3rd Prime : Gatalouni Oyoun Essoud – Wadih El Safi
 4th Prime : El Zina Labsat Khalkhalaha – Samir Yazbek
 5th Prime : Aanabi – Karem Mahmoud
 6th Prime : Wa Baad Kentom – Mohammed Abdu
 7th Prime : Sawt El Heda – Assi El Helani
 8th Prime : Kol Da Kan Leih – Mohammed Abdel Wahab and Nemshi wa Nemshi – Saber Rebaï
 Final: Ya Ain Ala Saber – Wadih El Safi and Lena Allah – Mohammed Abdu and "Aali El Kuffiyeh" – Mohammed Assaf*

International attention

Assaf has gained widespread popularity throughout the Arab world and among fellow Palestinians from the West Bank, Gaza Strip and the diaspora through his performance of well-known Arabic love songs and patriotic hymns for the Palestinian cause. Family members, neighbors and Palestinians in general have been waiting for his performance in Beirut every Friday night. Board member of Gaza Association for Culture and Arts Jamal Abu Qumsan stated Assaf "has struck a chord with Palestinians by singing classic Arabic songs that deal with issues other than war and struggle ... To many here, that kind of music offers them a sense of stability" amid constantly unstable circumstances due to the conflict with Israel and intra-Palestinian strife. Mohammed Assaf sang in English during one of the live shows of Arab Idol, performing the song "I Want It That Way" by the Backstreet Boys.

The buzz Assaf created has reached the United States, Europe, and recently other parts of Asia, due to articles posted by American-based news websites such as  Wet Paint, Voice of America, 12 News, The Japan Times, the CNN news website CNN International, as well as European-based news sites such as Germany's Frankfurter Rundschau. The Guardian published an article titled "Arab Idol favourite Mohammed Assaf carries hopes of Palestinians into final",. Most sites emphasize his rough journey to reach where he is now and his appeal across languages.

Post his widely expected win, Al Jazeera English interviewed him in Doha, Qatar, during his tour, and dedicated an entire episode of the programme Inside Story detailing Assaf's journey through Arab Idol. He was described as "the wedding singer from Gaza who was brought up in a refugee camp, to become  an international star and a Palestinian hero."

Political impact
While Assaf has normally avoided politics on the show, he has stated "I can't differentiate between my art and my patriotic attitude." Assaf condemned the ongoing Israeli occupation of West Bank and the poor living conditions in the Gaza Strip. He also stated that Palestinian prisoner Samer Issawi's long-term hunger strike protest had inspired him. He frequently performed donning the checkered keffiyeh popularly associated with Palestinian nationalism.

He is highly popular in the Palestinian territories, where the Washington Post notes that the "streets of Gaza empty out" when the show goes on air on Fridays and Saturdays. Throughout the West Bank and the Gaza Strip, large posters promoting Assaf have been hung on residences and shops. A source of pride, Assaf has been able to unite Palestinians' sympathies in a way that Palestinian political factions have not been able.

Some Palestinian politicians have showed their support for the singer who has been creating a sense of unity among Palestinians, regardless of differing political beliefs. Salam Fayyad, former Prime Minister of the Palestinian National Authority, called on all Palestinians to support Assaf. Palestinian President Mahmoud Abbas had also called for Palestinians everywhere, including the diaspora, to vote for Assaf. Assaf also won support from the late Palestinian leader Yasser Arafat's daughter, Zahwa, who encouraged viewers to vote for him.

Although prior to his participation in Arab Idol, Assaf stated he had been briefly detained by the security forces of the conservative Hamas party and paramilitary group—which maintains de facto control over Gaza—on over 20 different occasions in an effort to dissuade him from singing, the group has not suppressed Palestinian support for Assaf or viewership of the show. Signalling a shift in attitude, a Gaza-based Hamas MP, Yahya Mousa, lauded Assaf and referred to him the "ambassador for Palestinian art."

Film The Idol
The Idol is a 2015 Palestinian drama film directed by Hany Abu-Assad. It was shown in the Special Presentations section of the 2015 Toronto International Film Festival. The Idol was partially filmed on location in Gaza, the first feature film to be shot there in decades, with further filmings in Jenin, Amman, Beirut and Cairo. The Idol was produced in association with the Doha Film Institute and the support of the Netherlands Film Fund. the film was selected as the Palestinian entry for the Best Foreign Language Film at the 89th Academy Awards but it was not nominated.

After Arab Idol
Mohammed Assaf has enjoyed great pan-Arab and Arab diaspora popularity internationality engaging in many sold-out tours. He released a great number of music videos and in 2014, was invited to sing during FIFA World Cup celebrations with "Yalla Yalla". He has also released a number of highly successful collaborative singles. His massive 2017 hit "Baddek Enayah" (in Arabic بدّك عناية) features the  Cuban reggaeton group Gente de Zona. Also in 2017, he released "Rani" as a bilingual Arabic and French duet with French Algerian raï singer Faudel and in 2018 collaborated with Lebanese-Canadian star Massari in the single "Roll with It".

Personal life
Assaf married the 28-year-old Reem Ouda in an intimate wedding on August 8, 2020. Only family and handful of friends attended. Ouda is a Palestinian-Danish person who lived with her family in Saudi Arabia for a few years, before moving to Denmark after her father died.

Discography

Albums
 2014: Assaf (in Arabic عساف)
 2017: Ma Wahshnak (in Arabic ما وحشناك)
 2021: Qesas min Flistin (Arabic قصص من فلسطين)

Singles and music videos
2014: "Ya Halali Ya Mali" (in Arabic يا حلالي يا مالي)
2015: "Aywa Ha Ghanni" (in Arabic ايوه هغني)
2016: "Seyouf El Ezz" (in Arabic سيوف العز)
2017: "Baddek Enayah" (feat. Gente de Zona) (in Arabic بدّك عناية)
2017: "Rani" (with Faudel)
2018: "Roll with It" (with Massari)
2019: "Kermalak Enta"
2020: "Shhalhalawa"
2020: "Dalaa Dalouna"
2020: "Salam Allah"
2020: "Filastin 'int alruwh"
2020: "Al Hayat"
2021: "Mraytak"
2021: "Al Hara"
2021: "Bahrek Gaza"
2021: "Salute to Al Quds"
2021: "Ya Banat Bladna"

References

External links
 Official Facebook page

1989 births
Living people
Palestinian male singers
People from the Gaza Strip
People from Misrata
Contestants from Arabic singing competitions
Idols (TV series) winners